Southern Ivy is an informal term, and not an official body, that has been used in the  U.S. to compare Southern universities to the schools of the northeastern Ivy League in some way, usually in academic quality or in social prestige. The "Southern Ivy League," referred to as the "Magnolia League", was also a failed attempt to construct an athletic conference with schools that had similar "academic missions and philosophies".  Given that the term is colloquial, there is no comprehensive, objective or definitive list of schools that are considered "Southern Ivies".

Magnolia Conference

The effort to create a Southern athletic conference originated during the 1950s. Harvie Branscomb, then-chancellor at Vanderbilt University, originally attempted to establish a rivalry between Vanderbilt and traditional Ivy League schools to foster relationships with academically-oriented schools. The school followed through on this effort and played a game against Yale in October 1948. However, after the Vanderbilt Commodores shut out the Yale Bulldogs, 35-0, Yale said they no longer wanted to play Vanderbilt. This caused Branscomb to call a meeting with the presidents of other Southern private universities in the late 1950s—Southern Methodist University (SMU), Emory University, Rice University, Duke University and Tulane University— where Branscomb suggested they try to establish a new sports conference where small, academically-inclined private schools could compete.

In the early 1960s, the idea for the "Magnolia Conference" gained popularity. In 1963, Tulane was frustrated by its level of competition within the Southeastern Conference since many of the schools had lower academic expectations for football players. They considered withdrawing from the SEC to compete with schools with similar aims.  According to the Rice Thresher, the era was a time when "the academic disparity between show-me-the-money schools and the schools less inclined to compromise academics was just beginning to become more evident." The "Magnolia Conference" had the vision to "maintain high-end Division I budgets and schedules, while avoiding some of the crasser extremes of the big business of college sports". However, this "Southern Ivy League" never got off the ground. Duke did not want to give up its rivalry with the University of North Carolina, and SMU and Rice were not willing to give up their shares of revenue flowing from the then-lucrative Cotton Bowl Classic because of its tie-in with the Southwest Conference.

Notes

Further reading

Universities and colleges in the United States
Southern United States